Manole Pass (‘Prohod Manole’ \'pro-hod ma-'no-le\) is the ice-covered saddle of elevation  separating Veregava Ridge from Doyran Heights in the east foothills of Vinson Massif in Sentinel Range, Ellsworth Mountains in Antarctica.  It is part of the glacial divide between the upper courses of Dater Glacier to the southwest and its tributary Hansen Glacier to the northeast.

The saddle is named after the settlement of Manole in Southern Bulgaria.

Location
US mapping in 1961, updated in 1988.

Maps
 Vinson Massif.  Scale 1:250 000 topographic map.  Reston, Virginia: US Geological Survey, 1988.
 Antarctic Digital Database (ADD). Scale 1:250000 topographic map of Antarctica. Scientific Committee on Antarctic Research (SCAR). Since 1993, regularly updated.

Notes

References
 Manole Pass Saddle. SCAR Composite Antarctic Gazetteer.
 Bulgarian Antarctic Gazetteer. Antarctic Place-names Commission. (details in Bulgarian, basic data in English)

External links
 Manole Pass. Copernix satellite image

Mountain passes of Ellsworth Land
Bulgaria and the Antarctic